Askersund Municipality (Askersunds kommun) is a municipality in Örebro County in central Sweden. Its seat is located in the city of Askersund.

The present municipality was created in 1971, when the former City of Askersund was merged with the rural municipalities Hammar and Lerbäck.

Localities 
 Askersund (seat)
 Zinkgruvan
 Lerbäck
 Mariedamm
 Åmmeberg
 Åsbro

Twin towns
Askersund's two twin towns with the year of its establishing:

(1945) Eura, Finland 
(1990) Jordanów, Poland

Elections
These are the results of the elections in the municipality since the first election after the municipal reform, being held in 1973. The exact results of Sweden Democrats were not listed at a municipal level by SCB from 1988 to 1998 due to the party's small size at the time. "Turnout" denotes the percentage of eligible people casting any ballots, whereas "Votes" denotes the number of valid votes only.

Riksdag elections

References

External links

Askersund Municipality - Official site

Municipalities of Örebro County